Miodowa (lit. Honey Street) is a street in Warsaw's Old Town. More precisely, it links the Krakowskie (Cracow Suburb) Street in with Krasiński Square. It is also the name of a street in the Kazimierz district in Kraków.

History

In the 16th century Miodowa Street was renowned for its gingerbread shops; hence its name. During the 18th century the Italian painter Bernardo Bellotto, better known as il Canaletto, the court painter for Poland's last king Stanisław August Poniatowski, painted with meticulous details the streets and architecture of 18th century Warsaw.

Canaletto painted a view of the street with all the hustle and bustle of its traffic. The buildings are, on the right, the palace of Crown Marshal Jan Klemens Branicki (built in 1740) and, on the left, the palace of the Bishops of Cracow (built in 1622, rebuilt between 1760-1762 by Jakub Fontana) and the mansion of the Warsaw banker, Piotr Tepper (built in 1774 according to design by Efraim Szreger, destroyed during the Warsaw Uprising and not rebuilt after the war). Further back can be seen the roof of the 17th-century church of the Capuchins, founded by King John III Sobieski (built between 1683-1694 by Tylman van Gameren), which bas a chapel containing the urn with his heart. Behind the chapel partially in front of the Krasiński Palace in the far distance can be seen on the left side the Lelewel Palace, another work of Efraim Szreger.

References

In-line:

Gallery

Historical images

Features (visible at the Canaletto painting)

External links
 Miodowa in 19th century (see Plac Krasińskich)

Streets in Warsaw
Śródmieście, Warsaw
Tourist attractions in Warsaw